John Cox (born October 13, 1944) was a Republican member of the Virginia House of Delegates. He represented the 55th district, which includes part of Hanover County.

Cox announced that he would not run for reelection in 2013.

Electoral history 
Cox ran in the 2009 election for the Virginia House of Delegates in the 55th district, with the aim of replacing retiring delegate Frank Hargrove. In a three-way primary, Cox narrowly defeated Rusty McGuire by 232 votes. In the General Election, Cox defeated Democrat Robert Barnette by a huge margin of almost fifty points.

References

External links
Official Bio

1944 births
Living people
Republican Party members of the Virginia House of Delegates
Politicians from Wilmington, North Carolina